Hosagrahar Visvesvaraya Jagadish (Jag) is a computer scientist in the field of database systems research. He is a Fellow of ACM, Fellow of AAAS, the Distinguished University Professor of Electrical Engineering and Computer Science at the University of Michigan at Ann Arbor, the director of MIDAS (Michigan Institute for Data Science), and a Senior Scientific Director of the National Center for Integrative Biomedical Informatics established by the National Institutes of Health.

External links
Michigan Homepage

Database researchers
American computer scientists
Living people
University of Michigan faculty
Year of birth missing (living people)